A Cry in the Night is a Canadian drama film, directed by Jean Beaudry and released in 1996. The film stars Pierre Curzi as Pierre, a night watchman at a college who indulges his passion for amateur astronomy on the building's roof; one night his routine is disturbed by the appearance of Nathaël (Félix-Antoine Leroux), a young man who is videotaping a farewell letter to his ex-girlfriend, and Hélène (Louise Richer), Pierre's own girlfriend who breaks up with him after revealing that she is pregnant.

The film's cast also includes Jocelyn Bérubé and Sabine Karsenti.

Éric Cayla received a Genie Award nomination for Best Cinematography at the 18th Genie Awards in 1997.

References

External links
 

1996 films
1996 drama films
Canadian drama films
Films directed by Jean Beaudry
Films shot in Quebec
Films set in Quebec
French-language Canadian films
1990s Canadian films